Stanley Fenley (4 January 1896 – 2 September 1972) was an English first-class cricketer. He was a right-handed batsman who bowled leg break and made his first-class debut for Surrey in the 1924 County Championship against Glamorgan. Fenley represented Surrey in 116 first-class matches from 1924 to 1929, with his final first-class appearance for the county coming against Lancashire in the 1929 County Championship.

In his 116 first-class matches for the county Fenley took 345 wickets at a bowling average of 28.70, with 19 five wicket hauls, 4 ten wicket hauls in a match and best figures of 8/69 against Glamorgan in 1926. In addition Fenley took 51 catches in the field for Surrey.

He played 116 matches in the 1920s and made a brief comeback for Hampshire, aged 39. He took 346 wickets in all.

In addition to playing first-class matches for Surrey, Fenley also represented Hampshire in three first-class matches in 1935, six years after playing first-class cricket for Surrey. Fenley's debut for Hampshire came against Nottinghamshire with his final first-class match for Hampshire coming in the same season against Yorkshire.

As well as playing first-class cricket, Fenley also stood in a single first-class match as an Umpire in the 1927 match against the Royal Navy and the Royal Air Force.

Fenley died at Bournemouth, Hampshire on 2 September 1972 at the age of 76.

External links
Stanley Fenley at Cricinfo
Stanley Fenley at CricketArchive
Matches and detailed statistics for Stanley Fenley

1896 births
1972 deaths
People from Kingston upon Thames
People from Surrey
English cricketers
Surrey cricketers
Hampshire cricketers
English cricket umpires